"Past Life" is a song by American singer Trevor Daniel. It was written by Daniel, Finneas O'Connell, Caroline Pennell, Jay Stolar, Mick Coogan and Sean Myer, with production handled by O'Connell and Sean Myer. The song was released by Alamo Records and Interscope Records on March 6, 2020, as single for his album Nicotine (2020). An official remix with American singer Selena Gomez was released on June 26, 2020. Idolator describe the song as a "looming summer smash". Another remix adding American rapper Lil Mosey as a featured artist was released on July 31, 2020.

Music video 
The music video for "Past Life" was directed by Vania Heymann and Gal Muggia and was officially released on July 14, 2020.

Commercial performance
On the Billboard Hot 100, the song debuted and peaked at number 77, becoming Daniel's second chart entry on the chart. The song also entered charts in Canada and Hungary peaking at number 68 and number 38 respectively.

Live performances
On August 18, 2020 Daniel performed a solo version of the song in a medley with "Falling" on The Tonight Show with Jimmy Fallon.

Charts

Certifications

Release history

References

2020 singles
2020 songs
Selena Gomez songs
Trevor Daniel (singer) songs
Song recordings produced by Finneas O'Connell
Songs written by Finneas O'Connell
Songs written by Caroline Pennell